Elizabeth Blount (// – 1540), commonly known during her lifetime as Bessie Blount, was a mistress of Henry VIII of England.

Early life
Blount was the daughter of Sir John Blount and Catherine Peshall, of Kinlet, Bridgnorth, Shropshire. Sir John Blount was a loyal, if unremarkable, servant to the English Royal family, who accompanied King Henry to France in 1513 when he waged war against Louis XII of France. The Blount family was of gentry status but had no real national input until the birth of Henry Fitzroy, the only acknowledged illegitimate child of Henry VIII.

Little is known of Elizabeth Blount's early years, except for her reputation as a beauty, and for her famous affair with King Henry VIII (born 1491; he was about seven years older than Bessie). There is no known portrait of her in existence. As a young girl, she came to the King's Court as a maid-of-honour to the King's wife, Catherine of Aragon. It was there that the young woman caught the eye of the King and became his mistress during 1514 or 1515, a relationship which continued for about eight years.

Royal mistress
Blount's relationship with Henry VIII lasted for some time, compared to his other affairs, which were generally short-lived and unacknowledged. On 15 June 1519, Blount bore the King an illegitimate son who was named Henry FitzRoy, later created Duke of Richmond and Somerset and Earl of Nottingham. He was the only illegitimate son of Henry VIII whom the King acknowledged as his own. After the child's birth, the affair ended for unknown reasons. For proving that King Henry was capable of fathering healthy sons, Elizabeth Blount prompted a popular saying, "Bless 'ee, Bessie Blount", often heard during and after this period.

Soon after the birth of his son, the King began an affair with Mary Boleyn, who may have been partly the reason for Blount's dismissal. Like Blount, Boleyn was never formally recognised as the King's mistress and the position of public maîtresse-en-titre was never offered by Henry to anyone but Anne Boleyn, who rejected it.

Later life
In 1522, Blount entered an arranged marriage with Gilbert Tailboys, 1st Baron Tailboys of Kyme (sometimes spelled "Talboys"), whose family was said by some to have a history of insanity. After her marriage, Blount does not figure much in the day-to-day affairs of the Tudor monarchy or in the official records. A fleeting comment was made about her in 1529, when a palace chaplain remarked that she was (or had been) better-looking than Henry's then-fiancée, Anne Boleyn, who, he concluded, was competent belle ("quite beautiful") in her own right.

On 23 July 1536, Blount's son Henry FitzRoy died, probably of tuberculosis ("consumption"). Her husband, Gilbert, Lord Tailboys, also predeceased her, dying in 1530 but leaving her a widow of comfortable means. By her marriage to Tailboys, she had three further children, two sons, George and Robert, and one daughter, Elizabeth.

After the death of Tailboys, Blount was wooed unsuccessfully by Leonard Gray. She subsequently married a younger man whose Lincolnshire lands adjoined hers, Edward Clinton or Fiennes, 9th Baron Clinton, thus becoming Elizabeth Fiennes. They were married some time between 1533 and 1535, and this union produced three daughters.

For a short while, she was a lady-in-waiting to Henry's fourth wife, Anne of Cleves, but due to her own health problems she left the Queen's service around the time the royal marriage was dissolved and did not serve Anne's successor, Catherine Howard. Blount returned to her husband's estates, where she died shortly after July 1540. It has traditionally been asserted that the cause of her death was consumption.

Importance 
Compared with Henry's first two wives, Catherine of Aragon and Anne Boleyn, Blount's importance to history was negligible. However, she was certainly more important than any other mistress the king had during his first marriage. Blount was the mother of Henry's only acknowledged illegitimate child, and at one point in the 1520s it was suggested that her son should be named the King's legal heir. Although nothing came of these plans, and Blount had little to do with her son's upbringing, that she was the mother of such an important child made her an object of interest to many of her contemporaries.

Henry was convinced that because he fathered a healthy son with Elizabeth that his wife's inability to bear him a son was Catherine's fault. The queen gave birth to at least three boys, yet only the first lived as long as seven weeks. This led Henry to believe there was something wrong with his marriage to Catherine, and that he needed to annul his marriage.

Children 
From King Henry VIII:

 Henry FitzRoy, 1st Duke of Richmond and Somerset, 1st Earl of Nottingham, born 1519, died 1536. Married Lady Mary Howard. No children.

From a first marriage to Gilbert Talboys, 1st Baron Tailboys of Kyme:

 Elizabeth Tailboys, 4th Baroness Tailboys of Kyme, born c. 1520, died 1563, who at the death of her brother, the 3rd baron, became the 4th Baroness Tailboys of Kyme. Married firstly Thomas Wymbish, of Nocton (died 1553), who claimed the title in his wife's right. It was, however, ruled that a husband could not so bear his wife's title unless he had a child by her; this ruling was the final decision on the point. Married secondly, c.1552, as his second wife, Ambrose Dudley, 3rd Earl of Warwick (c. 1530–1590). She died in 1563, and, as she had no children, the barony became extinct.
 George Tailboys, 2nd Baron Tailboys of Kyme, born c. 1523, who succeeded as 2nd Baron Tailboys of Kyme, and died on 6 September 1540. Married Margaret Skipwith in 1539. No children.
 Robert Tailboys, 3rd Baron Tailboys of Kyme, de jure Lord Kyme, born c. 1523, died 1541.

From a second marriage to Edward Clinton, 1st Earl of Lincoln:

 Lady Bridget Clinton (born c. 1536). She married Robert Dymoke (1531-1580), of Scrivelsby, Lincolnshire, some time around 1556 and had ten children. Dymoke (sometimes spelt Dymock or Dymocke) was a devout Catholic and named a martyr after his death.
 Lady Katherine Clinton (b. c. 1538 – d. 14 August 1621). She married William Burgh, 2nd Baron Burgh of Gainsborough (c. 1522 – 10 October 1584), son of Thomas Burgh, 1st Baron Burgh. Had two children, one of them being Thomas Burgh, 3rd Baron Burgh.
 Lady Margaret Clinton (b. c. 1539). She married Charles Willoughby, 2nd Baron Willoughby of Parham (died 1603), and had five children.

In popular culture
Bessie Blount appeared as a character in the 2007 television series The Tudors, portrayed by Ruta Gedmintas.

The character Bessie Blount appeared in the 2019 television series The Spanish Princess, portrayed by Chloe Harris.

Notes

Further reading
 Haeger, Diane. The Queen's Rival
 Hart, Kelly. The Mistresses of Henry VIII
 Murphy, Beverley A. Bastard Prince: Henry VIII's Lost Son
 Norton, Elizabeth, Bessie Blount: Mistress to Henry VIII, Amberley Publishing 2011, 384pp, 77 illus

Year of birth uncertain
Date of birth unknown
1540 deaths
Place of birth missing
16th-century deaths from tuberculosis
Elizabeth
English courtiers
Tailboys
Mistresses of Henry VIII
People from Bridgnorth
Tuberculosis deaths in England
Household of Catherine of Aragon